Leucanopsis falacra is a moth of the family Erebidae. It was described by Paul Dognin in 1891. It is found in Ecuador.

References

 Natural History Museum Lepidoptera generic names catalog

falacra
Moths described in 1891